Dog Days is an album by the Southern rock band Atlanta Rhythm Section, released in 1975. The title single reached #49 on the Canadian pop charts and #43 on the AC charts.

Track listing
"Crazy" (Buie, Nix, Daughtry) – 3:07
"Boogie Smoogie" (Buie, Nix, Bailey) – 7:57
"Cuban Crisis" (Buie, Nix, Cobb) – 3:50
"It Just Ain't Your Moon" (Buie, Nix, Daughtry) – 4:50
"Dog Days" (Buie, Nix, Daughtry) – 3:35
"Bless My Soul" (Cobb) – 4:00
"Silent Treatment" (Buie, Nix, Bailey) – 5:15
"All Night Rain" (Buie, Nix, Daughtry, Bob McRee) – 3:10

Personnel
Barry Bailey - guitar
Buddy Buie - vocals
J.R. Cobb - guitar, background vocals
Dean Daughtry - keyboards
Paul Goddard - bass guitar
Ronnie Hammond - vocals, background vocals
Robert Nix - percussion, drums, background vocals

Production
Producer: Buddy Buie
Engineer: Rodney Mills

Charts

References

Atlanta Rhythm Section albums
1975 albums
Albums produced by Buddy Buie
Polydor Records albums